"Island in the Sun" is a song by the American rock band Weezer. It is the second single from the band's second self-titled album Weezer, released in 2001. "Island in the Sun" was not originally planned to be on the album, but producer Ric Ocasek fought for its inclusion. It was a successful radio single and perhaps the band's biggest hit ever outside of the United States, reaching No. 31 in the UK and No. 17 in France. In January 2002, the Australian Triple J Hottest 100 ranked the song 7 in its 2001 countdown. "Island in the Sun" is also the most-licensed track in the Weezer catalog. In 2009, Pitchfork named it the 495th greatest song of the 2000s.

In late 2001, the band reworked the song's solo for their live show. In 2005, lead singer Rivers Cuomo would often open the band's encore by playing "Island in the Sun" alone on an acoustic guitar in the back of the venue they were playing.

The song is much lighter than the album's first single, "Hash Pipe." It is also a bonus track on some versions of Weezer's next album, Maladroit.

Composition
"Island in the Sun" is an alternative rock and power pop song that is about three minutes and twenty seconds. According to the sheet music published at Musicnotes.com by Hal Leonard Music, it is written in the time signature of common time, with a moderate tempo of 116 beats per minute. "Island in the Sun" is composed in the key of G major, while Rivers Cuomo's vocal range spans one and a quarter octaves, from the low note of E4 to the high note of G5. It follows the vi–ii–V–I progression, utilising the chords of E minor, A minor, D major and G major.

Reception
Melissa Bobbitt at About.com ranked "Island in the Sun" as the 12th best Weezer song, saying it "exemplified a relaxed Southern California spirit". It was named as one of the 12 best post-Pinkerton Weezer songs by The A.V. Club, where they refer to it as "...a reminder that Cuomo really does deserve Brian Wilson comparisons for reasons beyond being a hermetic weirdo with a solid grasp of pop songcraft". Emily Tartanella of Magnet considers it the most overrated Weezer song, stating it should be "retired" from commercials and radio stations. Tartanella describes it as "so laid back it's practically catatonic".

Music videos
There are two different videos for "Island in the Sun".

Version 1: Mexican wedding
This video was directed by Marcos Siega. It shows Weezer playing the song at a Mexican couple's wedding reception and features all four band members. The groom in the video is played by actor/singer Tony Garcia.

Version 2: Animals
This video was directed by Spike Jonze. It features Weezer playing with various wild animals on a supposedly remote hill (though it was actually filmed a short distance outside of Los Angeles, thought to be in the hills near Simi Valley). Only Brian Bell, Rivers Cuomo, and Pat Wilson appear in this video, as bassist Mikey Welsh had left the band shortly before shooting.

Track listings

An erroneous short mix of "Always" ended up on the singles, and the correct mix (2:48) was released as an MP3 on the band's website.

Charts

Weekly charts

Year-end charts

Certifications

Release history

References

External links

2001 songs
2001 singles
Geffen Records singles
Music videos directed by Marcos Siega
Music videos directed by Spike Jonze
Song recordings produced by Ric Ocasek
Songs written by Rivers Cuomo
Weezer songs